Tazehabad-e Heydarbeygi (also Romanized as Tāzehābād-e Ḩeydarbeygī and Tāzehābād Ḩeydar Beygī; also known as Tāzehābād) is a village in Cheleh Rural District, in the Central District of Gilan-e Gharb County, Kermanshah Province, Iran. At the 2006 census, its population was 100, in 26 families.

References 

Populated places in Gilan-e Gharb County